Secret Agent (German: Der Geheimagent) is a 1932 German thriller film directed by and starring Harry Piel and also featuring Maria Matray, Eduard von Winterstein and Leonard Steckel. It was shot at the Staaken and Grunewald Studios in Berlin. The film's sets were designed by the art director Gustav A. Knauer. It was distributed by the German branch of Universal Pictures.

Synopsis
A chemist has developed a deadly new poison gas that could wipe out humanity. The adventure Harry Parker sets out to get his hands on the formula and destroy it.

Cast
 Harry Piel as Harry Parker
 Maria Matray as Ruth Managan
 Eduard von Winterstein as 	Professor Managan
 Leonard Steckel as Oberst Salit
 Reinhold Bernt as 	Baschin
 Ferdinand Hart as 	Brandes
 Ferdinand von Alten as 	Minister
 Kurt Mühlhardt as 	Sänger
 Wilhelm Diegelmann		
 Erich Dunskus	
 Gerhard Dammann	
 Leopold von Ledebur
 Paul Moleska		
 Charly Berger 		
 Hans Wallner

References

Bibliography 
 DeCelles, Naomi. Recollecting Lotte Eisner: Cinema, Exile, and the Archive. University of California Press, 2022.
 Klaus, Ulrich J. Deutsche Tonfilme: Jahrgang 1932. Klaus-Archiv, 1988.

External links 
 

1932 films
Films of the Weimar Republic
1930s action films
German action films
1930s German-language films
Films directed by Harry Piel
German black-and-white films
1930s German films
Films shot in Berlin
Universal Pictures films
Films shot at Staaken Studios